Éloi Firmin Féron (1802–1876) was a French neoclassicist painter.
A student of  Antoine-Jean Gros, he won the Prix de Rome for his   Damon et Pythias in 1826, aged "twenty-four and a half".
He went on to become a favourite of Louis Philippe I and his sons, contributing much to the galleries of Versailles., where most of his major works are now on exhibit, including Entrée de Charles VIII à Naples (1837), Bataille de Fornoue (1838), Prise de Rhodes (1840), besides various portraits.

References

1802 births
1876 deaths
French neoclassical painters
19th-century French painters
French male painters
Prix de Rome for painting
19th-century French male artists